Lake Sibinacocha (possibly from Quechua siwina whistle, qucha lake, lagoon) is a lake in Peru. It is ranked as the 22nd highest lake in the world. It is located in the Cusco Region, Canchis Province, Pitumarca District. Sibinacocha lies in the Vilcanota Range, south of Chumpe and southwest of Condoriquiña.

The lake contains Inca artifact, some of which have been recovered from the lake. Sacred sites around the lake have been studied as possible locations of the lost Ausangate temple.  The area has been studied for its importance to the greater Urubamba-Vilcanota watershed.  A high-altitude diver, Geoffrey Belter, died in 2014 while exploring the lake.  

An earthen dam was erected at the lake in 1996. It is operated by EGEMSA.

See also
 Lake Singrenacocha
List of lakes in Peru

References

Sibinacocha
Sibinacocha
Dams in Peru
Buildings and structures in Cusco Region